Yarraville is an inner-city suburb in Melbourne, Victoria, Australia,  west of Melbourne's Central Business District, located within the City of Maribyrnong local government area.

Yarraville is bordered on the east by the junction of the Maribyrnong and the Yarra Rivers, and its southern boundary is the West Gate Freeway.

In 2020, Yarraville was named Australia's best suburb and fifth in the world. The suburb lies immediately north of the West Gate Bridge, and immediately west of its namesake, the Yarra River. Features of Yarraville include C.J. Cruickshank Park, Yarraville Oval, Beaton Reserve, Yarraville Gardens, Stony Creek and the Yarraville Village Shopping Strip.

History

Yarraville was named due to its proximity to the Yarra River. It was subdivided in 1859, and the residential development of the area commenced. In 1859 a railway line from Footscray to Williamstown was opened, which prompted land sales in the area. A large party to announce the subdivision was thrown, however the railway line operators declined to build a station at Yarraville. During the decade of 1870, a railway stop and post office were opened, Methodists established the area's first church, and a new primary school commenced operating. By 1880, Yarraville was developing into a hub for factories due to the ease of movement of goods via the nearby rail and Yarra River. Yarraville is situated on basaltic land, and bluestone was extracted for ballast for boats on the Yarra River and Port Phillip Bay. 

Throughout the 1880's, the area attracted engineers, iron founders, and rope-makers. Roads linking Yarraville with greater Melbourne were poor, however as railway and water connections improved, Yarraville became an attractive industrial location. 

In the 1950s, a sustained period of migration to Yarraville assisted in rapid development of the area. Many people of Greek origin were part of this migration trend. Commencing in the 1990s, the demographics of Yarraville started to change, resulting in what is now described as a "gentrified, trendy and hip area".

Yarraville Village

Located near Yarraville railway station on Anderson and Ballarat Streets, Yarraville is renowned in Melbourne for its unique character, architecture and quality of village life. Anderson and Ballarat Streets, in the heart of the Yarraville Village, are lined with refurbished 19th century buildings and dotted with neighbourhood cafés, restaurants and boutique shops. 

This village atmosphere is anchored by the restored Sun Theatre and the adjacent Sun Bookshop, a prominent landmark in the Yarraville community with its unique art deco architecture and its 6 cinemas. Notable examples of Edwardian and Victorian architecture can be found in Yarraville.

The Yarraville Village is home to many award winning restaurants and cafes. Popular café choices include; Cornershop Yarraville, Woven Café and Willis & Anderson. A reflection of Melbourne's multicultural nature, Yarraville offers an array of world cuisine styles including Greek, Italian, Modern Asian, Indian, Cambodian, Mexican, Thai, Chinese and Modern Australian.

Retail shops in the village provide an eclectic shopping experience, from books to the work of a local artist, to quality clothes, shoes, gifts, jewellery, wines, gourmet foods, and a record shop.

Administration

Local government
The administration of Yarraville is managed by the City of Maribyrnong. The suburb falls into the ward of the Council named Yarraville ward, which is represented by the Mayor, Michael Clarke, Councillor Simon Crawford, and Cr Jorge Andres Jorquera.

Transportation

Public transport
Yarraville railway station is a suburban railwayt station located in the centre of the village area, 20 minutes from the Melbourne CBD. The station is serviced by all trains on the Williamstown line, and Laverton bound trains on the Werribee line. The station is located near Anderson Street in Yarraville Village, access via Birmingham Street to the North (for trains heading towards the City), and Woods Street on the South (heading away from the City). Yarraville station is within the Zone 1 region of Melbourne's public transport ticketing system.

Several bus routes also service the suburb:

223 Yarraville – Highpoint Shopping Centre via Seddon, Footscray station (every day). Operated by Kinetic Melbourne. 
409 Highpoint SC – Yarraville via Victoria University Footscray, Footscray station (every day). Operated by CDC Melbourne. 
411 Footscray – Laverton via Geelong Road, Altona Gate SC, Altona, Altona Meadows (every day). Operated by CDC Melbourne. 
412 Footscray – Laverton via Geelong Road, Altona Gate SC, Altona, Altona Meadows (every day). Operated by CDC Melbourne. 
414 Footscray – Aircraft via Geelong Road, Laverton North (Monday to Saturday). Operated by CDC Melbourne. 
432 Yarraville – Newport via Altona Gate SC (every day). Operated by Transit Systems. 
431 Yarraville – Kingsville (Monday to Saturday). Operated by Transit Systems. 
472 Moonee Ponds Junction – Williamstown via Ascot Vale, Flemington Racecourse, Footscray, North Williamstown station (every day). Operated by Transit Systems. 
944 City – Werribee via Spotswood, Newport, Hoppers Crossing (Saturday and Sunday mornings). NightRider service, operated by Dysons.

Road
Residents of Yarraville have concern about the negative effects of the growing number of trucks using the residential streets. In 2005 the Maribyrnong Truck Action Group (MTAG) was set up by the local community to protest the rising number of trucks. Residents believe they cause excessive noise pollution and air pollution, threatening the health and safety of all in Yarraville.

On 5 April 2006, a large protest organised by residents and MTAG was held in a busy Yarraville intersection, calling for restrictions towards trucks. The large turnout of the protest gained press attention including all major newspapers and network television. This still continues to be a major issue in the Yarraville district.

Places of worship

There are many religious organisations and places of worship in Yarraville, including Baptist, Buddhist, Catholic, The Church of Jesus Christ of Latter-day Saints, Orthodox and Uniting Church.

Yarraville also houses the Victorian International Buddhist College and Greek Orthodox Language school.

Community

Arts and culture
The area possesses a few musical collectives including the Footscray – Yarraville City Band and the Yarraville Mouth Organ Band. The main film society in the area is the Sun Theatre, located in Yarraville Village. There is also the Yarraville Community Centre which provides a range of resources, classes, activities and services for all ages and abilities.

Yarraville Markets is held on the first Saturday and Sunday of each month. The market is held in the Masonic Hall (Corner of Willis Street and Canterbury Street Yarraville) from 10 am till 3 pm. Everything sold at the market is handmade and/or Australian Made.

Festivals
The annual Yarraville Festival is held in Yarraville Village and continues to be a major cultural event in the community. The festival caters for more than 25,000 people and is professionally operated by a team of dedicated volunteers that reside in Yarraville. Street performers, carnival amusements, art exhibitions, teddy bear picnics, fashion parades, poetry readings, market stalls and performances across many stages, provide an array of entertainment for all.

Since 2016 the annual Albanian Australian Community Festival has been held at Yarraville Gardens after relocating from Footscray park in 2015.

Parks
There are two public major parks in Yarraville, being the Yarraville Gardens and Beaton Reserve. Both contain pristine flowerbeds with areas for leisure and relaxation. 
 
Other parks include:
 Angliss Reserve 
 Bellairs Park 
 Cruickshank Park 
 Fels Park
 Frederick Street Reserve 
 Fyans Morven Reserve
 Goods Yard
 Hanmer Reserve
 Hyde Street Reserve
 Love Street Reserve
 McIvor Reserve
 McNish Reserve
 Sandford Grove Reserve
 Sinking Village

Sport
Swimming facilities for Yarraville residents are at the Yarraville Swim Centre, 3 Roberts Street West Footscray and at the Maribyrnong Aquatic Centre, Maribyrnong, located next to Highpoint Shopping Centre. The aquatic centre also provides yoga, gym facilities and other recreational activities.

There are many sporting clubs located in Yarraville such as:
 Yarraville Glory Football Club (soccer), established in 1966 and with a rich Greek and local heritage. 
 Footscray Baseball Club
 Yarraville Cricket Club
 Seddon Cricket Club
 With its neighbouring suburb Yarraville has an Australian Rules football team, Yarraville-Seddon Eagles, competing in the Western Region Football League. They are located at Yarraville Oval)
 Footscray Hockey Club
 Footscray Lacrosse Club
 South Park Rangers Soccer Club
 Yarraville Tennis Club
 Yarraville Trugo Club
 Footscray Angliss Cricket Club - formerly Footscray ANA CC

Cyclists in Yarraville are represented by MazzaBUG, the Maribyrnong Bicycle User Group.

Media

Yarraville was also the backdrop of the 1999 feature film The Wog Boy, and was mentioned in the 1992 Australian film Spotswood.

Yarraville was also the location for the Network Ten TV series 'The Wrong Girl'. Yarraville was chosen for its unique village and inner city location.

Two free, weekly suburban newspapers are distributed in Yarraville. The Maribyrnong Leader is part of the News Corporation-owned Leader Newspapers group and The Mail is part of the Fairfax Community Newspapers Victoria. Both are distributed every Wednesday.

Education

Primary schools in the immediate Yarraville area are:
 St. Augustine's Primary School (Previously known as St. Augustine's College, Yarraville)
 Kingsville Primary School
 Wembley Primary School
 Yarraville West Primary School

Many local residents are currently campaigning for a high school to be built in the area.

Notable people
 Rebecca Barnard – singer, songwriter, choir leader
 Gordon Binns - ornithologist, born in Yarraville.
 Josh Giddey- Basketballer
 Ross Hannaford – Australian rock guitarist with Daddy Cool, The Pink Finks and The Mighty Kong 
 Adam Hills – comedian and host of Spicks and Specks lives in Yarraville.
 Ron Hutchinson, jockey
 Ali McGregor – opera singer, actress and cabaret performer
 Luke Mathews - Australian Olympic athlete
 Dave O'Neil – comedian, radio personality and former cub scout
 Liam Picken - Australian Rules Football Player (Western Bulldogs)
 Nicola Roxon – Former Attorney-General of Australia, Minister for Health and Member of Parliament for Gellibrand
 Albert Tucker- artist, was born in Yarraville in 1919.
 John A. Tully – author and historian at Victoria University in Melbourne, Australia

See also
 City of Footscray – Yarraville was previously within this former local government area.
 City of Maribyrnong – Yarraville is located within this local government area.

References

External links
Yarraville Suburb Profile

Suburbs of Melbourne
Suburbs of the City of Maribyrnong